Li Jianying (May 1964 – November 4, 2006) was a People's Liberation Army Air Force pilot. Li chose to sacrifice himself in a crash landing rather than bail out and leave his plane to possibly plow into a village.

Li was born in Zhengzhou, Henan in 1964. He was known for his toughness and work ethic. He joined the army in 1982, and was a colonel and first-class pilot before his death. During his 22-year flying career, Li flew 5,003 times registering 2,389 hours of safe flights, and was awarded third- and second-class honors.

On November 14, 2006, Li Jianying was flying over an area containing seven villages, 814 households, an express toll station and a tile workshop when his fighter jet ran into a flock of pigeons. His jet had over 800 liters of aviation oil, more than 120 shells, a rocket, and explosive oxygen cylinders. Li knew that if he ejected, the jet would go out of control and possibly kill people. He radioed in that he was going to attempt a forced landing. He tried to set down on a river bank, but his jet exploded on impact and he was killed. 

He was posthumously awarded a first-class merit and a gold medal for pilots, the highest honor for a pilot.  In 2008, he was tied for first place in CCTV's "China's 10 Most Moving People of 2007" award.

References

External links
 英雄李剑英--飞翔日记字字铁汉柔情
 殉职飞行员李剑英家人日记：遗体保持驾机动作

1964 births
2006 deaths
People's Liberation Army Air Force personnel
People from Zhengzhou